Union Township is an inactive township in Iron County, in the U.S. state of Missouri.

Union Township was established in 1857.

References

Townships in Missouri
Townships in Iron County, Missouri
1857 establishments in Missouri